2009 Oita Trinita season

Competitions

Player statistics

Other pages
 J. League official site

Oita Trinita
Oita Trinita seasons